Ceromella is a genus of ceromid camel spiders, first described by Carl Friedrich Roewer in 1933.

Species 
, the World Solifugae Catalog accepts the following three species:

 Ceromella focki (Kraepelin, 1914) — Namibia
 Ceromella hepburni (Hewitt, 1923) — South Africa
 Ceromella pallida (Pocock, 1900) — South Africa

References 

Arachnid genera
Solifugae